Canena is a city located in the province of Jaén, Spain. According to the 2014 estimate (INE), the city has a population of 1,981 inhabitants.

Locations 

The city itself is home to several businesses, such as Talleres Canenas S. L. (A Workshop located in the city). Canena is also home to the Café - Bar Porras, and the Café - Bar Chicote, along with the Balneario San Andrés (a Hotel located on the South side of city). Also located in city is a Caja GRANADA bank, and ATM belonging to the bank. The bank is located just down the street of the City Hall.

Notable Surroundings 

Canena is located in the Southern portion of Spain, in the Jaén Province. Surrounding it, are several National Parks, and Mountains.=, as well as the city of Jaén. To the East is the Sierras de Cazorla Natural Park, to the South is the city of Jaén and the Sierra Mágina, and to the North and West is the Sierra de Andújar Natural Park as well as the Sierra Morena.

References 

Municipalities in the Province of Jaén (Spain)